Talmadge is a surname. Notable people with the surname include:

A. A. Talmadge (1834–1887), American railroad executive
Constance Talmadge (1898–1973), American actress, sister of Norma and Natalie
Eugene Talmadge (1884–1946), American politician
Herman Talmadge (1913–2002), American politician, son of Eugene
Madeleine Talmadge Force (1893–1940), Titanic survivor, widow of Col. John Jacob Astor IV
Natalie Talmadge (1896–1969), American actress
Norma Talmadge (1894–1957), American actress
Phil Talmadge (born c. 1952), Washington State Supreme Court justice
Richard Talmadge (1892–1981), American actor, stuntman and film director

See also
Talmadge Hayer (born 1941), convicted assassin of Malcolm X
Tallmadge (disambiguation)
Talmage (disambiguation)